RockNess 2010' was the fifth RockNess Festival to take place. It took place in Dores, Scotland, from 11–13 June 2010.

Line-up
The line-up was as follows.

References

2010
2010 in Scotland
2010 in British music
2010 music festivals
June 2010 events in the United Kingdom